Elloughton-cum-Brough is a civil parish in the East Riding of Yorkshire, England.

It comprises the town of Brough and the village of Elloughton.

In 2011 the parish council resolved to be called the Elloughton-cum-Brough Town Council.

According to the 2011 UK census, Elloughton-cum-Brough parish had a population of 10,075, an increase on the 2001 UK census figure of 7,388.

References

External links

Elloughton-cum-Brough Town Council

Civil parishes in the East Riding of Yorkshire